The 2020 Nordic Opening or the eight Ruka Triple was the 11th edition of the Nordic Opening, an annual cross-country skiing mini-tour event. The three-day event was the first competition round of the 2020–21 FIS Cross-Country World Cup.

Schedule

Overall leadership

The results in the overall standings were calculated by adding each skier's finishing times on each stage. On the sprint stage, the winners earned 30 bonus seconds, no bonus seconds were given on stages two and three. The skier with the lowest cumulative time became the overall winner of the Nordic Opening.

A total of CHF 252,000, both genders included, were awarded in cash prizes in the tournament. The overall winners of the Nordic Opening received CHF 25,000, with the second and third placed skiers getting CHF 18,000 and CHF 12,000 respectively. All finishers in the top 20 were awarded money. CHF 5,000 were given to the winners of each stage of the race, with smaller amounts given to places second and third.

Overall standings

Stages

Stage 1
27 November 2020
 The skiers qualification times counted in the overall standings. Bonus seconds werere awarded to the 30 skiers that qualifies for the quarter-finals, distributed as following:
 Final: 30–27–24–23–22–21
 Semi-final: 16–15–14–13–12–11
 Quarter-final: 5–5–5–4–4–4–4–4–3–3–3–3–3–2–2–2–2–2

Stage 2
28 November 2020
No bonus seconds were awarded on this stage.

Stage 3
29 November 2020
The race for "Winner of the Day" counts for 2020–21 FIS Cross-Country World Cup points. No bonus seconds were awarded on this stage.

World Cup points distribution
The overall winners were awarded 200 points. The winners of each of the three stages were awarded 50 points. The maximum number of points an athlete could earn was therefore 350 points.

References

Sources

 

Nordic Opening
2020
2020 in cross-country skiing
2020 in Finnish sport
November 2020 sports events in Europe